The Maritime Museum of Barcelona (MMB) is located in the building of Drassanes Reials de Barcelona, the royal arsenal of Barcelona, dedicated to shipbuilding between the thirteenth century and eighteenth century. The first mention of these arsenals date from 1243 in a document indicating the boundaries of the city of Barcelona where it mentions its shipyard.

It shows the history of the navigation from the early days together with the history of the Spanish Navy since the Catholic Monarchs, in the 15th century, up to the present. It also hosts several navigation instruments, weapons, portolans and paintings. The museum was declared Museum of National Interest by the Government of Catalonia.

Building

It is located inside Barcelona Royal Shipyard a shipyard and former military building of Gothic architecture placed at the Port Vell area of the Port of Barcelona. Construction started during the 13th century under the rule of Peter III of Aragon.

The building is of Gothic style, its construction was carried out in a first stage between 1283 / 1328 and the second between 1328 / 1390. Subsequent reforms and extensions have been made, basically keeping the original structure.

During excavations in 2012
it was discovered that in the late 16th century a new building was constructed on top of the old medieval dockyard, giving the building its current structure. This excavations also uncovered a Roman graveyard. The shipyard's restoration was finished in early 2013. The Museum was reopened in 2014.

See also 
 Majorcan cartographic school
 Cresques workshop
 Portolan chart
 José María Martínez-Hidalgo y Terán

References

Bibliography
Volume 3 (1998), Art de Catalunya, Urbanisme, arquitectura civil i industrial, Barcelona, Edicions L'isard. 
Volume 14 (2004), La Gran Enciclopèdia en català, Barcelona, Edicions 62. 

García Domingo, Enric, Història del Museu Marítim de Barcelona 1929/1939- Edició Museu Marítim de Barcelona
Ibañez, Cristina, Història del Museu Marítim de Barcelona 1940/1992- Edició Museu Marítim de Barcelona
Valldeoriola, Mar, Memòria del Museu Marítim de Barcelona 1993/1999- Edició Museu Marítim de Barcelona

External links 

 

Maritime museums in Catalonia
Military and war museums in Spain
Museums in Barcelona